Cóir Connacht ar chath Laighean ("Justice of Connacht on the battle of Leinster") is a fourteenth-century Irish poem.

It is an address to Aedh Ó Conchobair, King of Connacht (d. 1309 and is thought to be "the earliest extant bardic poem containing an 'arming the hero' sequence with reference to the new Norman style of arms.'

It is of a piece with An sluagh sidhe so i nEamhuin?, composed nearly four hundred years later.

References

Irish literature
Irish poems
Irish texts
Early Irish literature
Irish-language literature
Medieval poetry
O'Conor dynasty